Lauren Ashley Zakrin (born 1988 or 1989) is an American musical theatre actress. She was a finalist in MTV's Legally Blonde: The Musical – The Search for Elle Woods, coming in fourth place overall. She has appeared on Broadway, as well as in national tours and regional theatre.

Early life and education 
Zakrin was born in Rochester, Michigan, and attended Western Michigan University.

Career
Zakrin first became known as a finalist on MTV's 2008 reality TV show Legally Blonde: The Musical – The Search for Elle Woods. She made her professional acting debut as the understudy for the role of Elle Woods in the first US tour of the musical Legally Blonde; she and Laura Bell Bundy covered the role while Becky Gulsvig was unable to perform. The following year, Zakrin acted as a replacement in the leading role of Sandy in the US tour of Grease. From 2010 to 2011, she was an ensemble member and the understudy for Glinda in the first national tour of Wicked.

During the summer of 2011, Zakrin played Elle Woods in a regional production of Legally Blonde at The Muny Theater in St. Louis, Missouri. Following this, she starred as Brooke Pennington in the Las Vegas production of the 2012 Beach Boys musical Surf at Planet Hollywood, directed by Kristin Hanggi. In 2013, she joined the Off-Broadway cast of Natasha, Pierre & The Great Comet of 1812 as an ensemble member, while understudying the roles of Natasha and Sonya. She made her Broadway debut a year later, in 2014, as a replacement for the leading role of Sherrie in Rock of Ages.

In 2015, Zakrin reprised her roles in the American Repertory Theater production of Natasha, Pierre & The Great Comet of 1812. She remained in the cast during the show's transfer to Broadway from the fall of 2016 until 2017, when it officially closed.  In 2017, she originated the role of Kathryn Merteuil in the Off-Broadway production of Cruel Intentions: The '90s Musical and remained in the show until its closure in 2018.

Zakrin appeared as an ensemble member in the NBC television special of Jesus Christ Superstar Live in Concert in 2018. In early 2019, she played the lead role of Riley in the Off-Broadway musical We Are the Tigers. Later that year, she played Audrey in a regional production of Little Shop of Horrors. Zakrin was cast to play the role of Polly in the San Francisco production of Harry Potter and the Cursed Child, which opened in 2019. She also understudied the roles of Delphi and Moaning Myrtle. The production temporarily closed in 2020 due to the COVID-19 pandemic. In October 2021, Zakrin announced via Instagram that she would be joining the cast of Once Upon a One More Time during its tryout run at the Sidney Harman Hall in Washington D.C. as Ariel (based on the character from The Little Mermaid). The production began performances on November 30, 2021, and concluded on January 9, 2022.

Theatre credits

•

Filmography 
Television

References

External links
Official Website

American musical theatre actresses
Living people
People from Rochester Hills, Michigan
Year of birth missing (living people)
Western Michigan University alumni
21st-century American women